Who Are You? is a 2008 South Korean television series starring Yoon Kye-sang, Go Ara and Kang Nam-gil. It aired on MBC from March 3 to May 1, 2008 on Wednesdays and Thursdays at 21:55 for 17 episodes.

Plot
Son Il-gun is a middle-aged deliveryman and devoted father to his daughter, Young-in. Young-in just graduated from high school and is an aspiring cartoonist, but she is working part-time instead of going to college due to financial difficulties, which the quick-tempered young woman partly blames on her "loser" father. She has no idea that Il-gun was once a struggling artist in his youth, but now that one of his paintings was sold for an exorbitant amount to a collector in New York, a local gallery offers Il-gun a solo exhibition. But before he can make a decision, Il-gun dies in a traffic accident, leaving Young-in penniless. According to Buddhism, the soul of a dead person is allowed to wander for 49 days in order to let go of all earthly attachments before going to the afterlife. But Il-gun loves his daughter so much that he takes it one step further, and possesses a stranger's body to care for Young-in and make it up to her.

Cha Seung-hyo was abandoned as a child, then adopted and raised in the United States. He is now a cold-hearted, perfectionist corporate raider without any meaningful relationships. However, after a traffic accident, he begins to lose time and wake up in strange situations, and he eventually learns that Il-gun is spiritually possessing him for three hours a day. Not only does Young-in find it suspicious that this stranger is suddenly concerned about her well-being, buying her expensive clothes and food, but Seung-hyo's subordinates also find it weird that he periodically acts out of character like a manically cheerful, old-fashioned man. Against his will, Seung-hyo gets drawn into Young-in's life, and discovers that Shin Jae-ha, owner of Nuri Art Gallery, is ingratiating himself with her, hoping to find more of the late Il-gun's paintings and buy them off her for less than they're worth. Young-in initially dislikes and mistrusts Seung-hyo, but the more she gets to know him, she glimpses his loneliness and gradually falls for him, which inevitably leads to awkwardness and hijinks.

Cast
Yoon Kye-sang as Cha Seung-hyo
Go Ara as Son Young-in
Kang Nam-gil as Son Il-gun, Young-in's father
Jin Yi-han as Shin Jae-ha, owner of Nuri Art Gallery
Park Ji-young as Kim Young-ae, Il-gun's girlfriend
Kim Sung-eun as Yoon Ha-young, gallery curator
Lee Eon as Kwon Yong-deok, Young-in's friend
Lee Min-jung as Yang Ji-sook, Young-in's friend
Jung Ho-bin as Yoon Hoo-jin, Seung-hyo's lawyer
Ahn Sun-young as Yeo Ji-won, Seung-hyo's secretary
Jo Deok-hyun as Driver Pi, Seung-hyo's chauffeur
Gi Ju-bong as Cha Chul-soo, Seung-hyo's father
Kim Mi-kyung as Oh Young-hee, Seung-hyo's mother
Kim Hyung-jong as Loan shark 1
Jung Hwan-gyu as Loan shark 2
Yoon Joo-sang as Sa Shin ("Angel of Death" or "Reaper")
Sunwoo Yong-nyeo as Geum Nan-hee, Jae-ha's mother
Baek Jung-min as Jang Dong-gun
Kim Sung-kyum as President Kim
Kwon Hae-hyo as Funeral service counselor
Min Ah-ryung
Park Kwang-jung

Awards and nominations

References

External links
 Who Are You? official MBC website 
 Who Are You? at MBC Global Media
 
 

2008 South Korean television series debuts
2008 South Korean television series endings
Korean-language television shows
MBC TV television dramas
South Korean romantic comedy television series
South Korean fantasy television series
Television series by IHQ (company)